The 2010–11 Eredivisie is the 55th season of Eredivisie since its establishment in 1955. It began on 6 August 2010 with the first matches of the season and ended on 29 May 2011 with the last matches of the European competition and relegation playoffs. FC Twente were the reigning champions, having won their first Dutch championship the previous season. A total of 18 teams took part in the league.
Ajax won their 30th title after beating FC Twente 3–1 on 15 May 2011.

Teams
RKC Waalwijk were directly relegated to the 2010–11 Eerste Divisie at the end of last season after finishing the season at the bottom of the table, ending one season at the highest division of Dutch football. They were replaced by 2009–10 Eerste Divisie champions De Graafschap, who return to the Eredivisie after one season.

Sparta Rotterdam were also relegated at the end of the promotion/relegation playoff tournament, as they lost their two-legged play-off against city rivals SBV Excelsior on away goals. Sparta hence completed a 5-year stint in the league, while Excelsior played for the first time at the top level in 2 years. In contrast, Willem II retained their Eredivisie spot after beating Go Ahead Eagles after extra time of the return leg.

Managerial changes

League table

Results

Play-offs

European competition
The teams placed fifth through eighth compete in a play-off tournament for one spot in the second qualifying round of the 2011–12 UEFA Europa League.

Semi-finals

Finals

Relegation
Excelsior and VVV-Venlo joined the Eerste Divisie-teams for the playoffs, after finishing 16th and 17th in the Eredivisie.

Round 1

Round 2

Round 3

VVV-Venlo and Excelsior will play in 2011–12 Eredivisie.

Top goalscorers
Source: Eredivisie (official site) , Soccerway, ESPN Soccernet

References

Eredivisie seasons
Netherlands
1